Regensberg is a municipality in the district of Dielsdorf in the canton of Zurich in Switzerland. It is located just to the west of Dielsdorf, on a ridge of the Lägern.

History

Regensberg was founded as a hilltop fortified settlement about 1245 by Baron Lüthold of Regensberg. The church, originally dating from the 13th century, was rebuilt in 1506.

During the mid 13th Century relations between the Barons of Regensberg and the city of Zürich became strained.  At about this same time, the barons began to argue with the Habsburgs over who would inherit the lands of the now extinct Kyburg family. In 1267 the disputes led to war between the barons and the combined Zürich and Habsburg forces.  The barons lost this war, and rapidly declined in power over the following half century. In 1302 they sold Regensberg to the Habsburgs.

The Habsburgs established an Amt Regensberg with a Habsburg appointed Schultheiß leading the town council. Under the Habsburgs the town expanded into a market town and Regensberg castle was the political center of the area now corresponding to the Dielsdorf district.

In 1409 the Habsburg duke Frederick IV (known as Frederick of the Empty Pockets) had to pawn Regensberg to the city of Zürich. However it wasn't until 1417 that Regensberg was fully owned by Zürich. They established an Obervogtei at Regensberg which ruled over 13 surrounding villages.

In 1540 the upper castle burned down, but the lower gates and the donjon survived because they were separated from the upper castle by a deep ditch. The upper castle was rebuilt in the following year. During the Reformation in Zürich the St. Martin's Abbey on Zürichberg at Fluntern was demolished. Stone blocks and two bells from the abbey were brought by ox-cart to the church at Regensberg to rebuild it.

Following the collapse of the Swiss Ancien Régime in 1798, Regensburg became part of the district of Bülach.  In 1803, with the Act of Mediation, Regensberg became the capital of its own sub-district.  In 1831 this expanded to become the district of Regensberg.  In 1871 the capital of the district moved to Dielsdorf and Regensberg became an independent municipality in that district.

Historic attractions include the half-timbered "Rote Rose" house dating from 1540.

Citizens
Eberhard II was born in Regensberg around 1170 and died in Friesach, Austria on 30 Nov 1246.  In 1196, he received the Bishopric of Brixen and, in 1200, the Archbishopric of Salzburg. Eberhard founded the independent bishoprics of Chiemsee (1215), Seckau (1218) and Lavant (1228) under Salzburg, as well as the collegiate churches of Völkermarkt and Friesach, where he also founded a Premonstratensian monastery in 1217. Eberhard added the counties of Pongau and Lungau to the Archbishopric. Eberhard was excommunicated in 1245 after refusing to publish a decree deposing the emperor and died suddenly the next year.

Geography

Of this area, 34.5% is used for agricultural purposes, while 56.7% is forested. The rest of the land, (8.8%) is settled.

Demographics
, 16.3% of the population was made up of foreign nationals. Over the last 10 years the population has decreased at a rate of -1.3%. Most of the population speaks German  (93.0%), with French being second most common ( 1.6%) and English being third ( 1.2%).

In the 2007 election the most popular party was the SVP which received 31.1% of the vote.  The next three most popular parties were the FDP (17.9%), the Green Party (14.5%) and the SPS (13.7%).

The age distribution of the population is children and teenagers (0–19 years old) make up 23.8% of the population, while adults (20–64 years old) make up 65.9% and seniors (over 64 years old) make up 10.3%.  In Regensberg about 86.8% of the population (between age 25-64) have completed either non-mandatory upper secondary education or additional higher education (either university or a Fachhochschule).

Regensberg has an unemployment rate of 1.48%.  , there were 18 people employed in the primary economic sector and about 6 businesses involved in this sector.  14 people are employed in the secondary sector and there are 3 businesses in this sector.  121 people are employed in the tertiary sector, with 16 businesses in this sector.

References

External links

 Official website 
 Commune flag

 
Cities in Switzerland
Municipalities of the canton of Zürich